The GCP Stadium is a football stadium in Strovolos, Nicosia District, Cyprus. Although small by international standards, it is the largest stadium in Cyprus, with a capacity of 22,859 and was opened in 1999. It serves as the home stadium for the 3 biggest football clubs of Nicosia APOEL, Olympiakos & Omonia. It is also the home stadium of the Cyprus national football team. A stadium under the same name, the old GSP Stadium, existed from 1902 until 1999 in the centre of Nicosia and had a capacity of 12,000.

History

Designed by Theo. David Architects, the new GSP Stadium opened for use on 6 October 1999. The complex has three arenas: a football stadium, an athletics stadium and an auxiliary football pitch intended for training. The stadium is owned by the Pancyprian Gymnastic Association. With an official seating capacity of 22,859 the GCP Stadium is the largest football venue in Cyprus. It is located at the entrance to Nicosia (as approached from the A1 highway) and was inaugurated in 1999 by the then-President Glafcos Clerides and Archbishop Chrysostomos I. The first game was held on 6 October 1999 and there was a friendly match between APOEL and Omonia, which ended 3–3.

Since then, the stadium is not only the home of Nicosian teams but usually of Cyprus national football team. During the World Cup 2006 qualifying round it was used as home for all matches of Cyprus. The stadium is the only one in Cyprus which satisfies UEFA Criteria. For this reason since 2004 it is used as home for all the teams of Cyprus in European Cups. Annually, the stadium hosts the Cypriot Super Cup. Also until 2005, it was hosting annually the Cypriot Cup final.

In 2002, the stadium was home for Israeli clubs for the UEFA Cup and UEFA Champions League matches. It hosted the UEFA Cup quarter final (as home for Hapoel Tel Aviv) between Hapoel Tel Aviv and A.C. Milan. It was also used by Maccabi Haifa for home stadium for the 2002–03 UEFA Champions League group stage matches and for the UEFA Cup matches. Some matches were attractive for Cypriots like the matches Maccabi Haifa-Olympiacos CFP and Maccabi Haifa-Manchester United, since those two Maccabi's rivals are very popular in Cyprus.

It's the only stadium in Cyprus build only for track & field games. In addition with the hotel, it provides a full training centre solution for athletes all over the world. During the Athens 2004 Olympic Games, many athletes from different countries used the stadium for training. In 2001, Bruno Zauli took place here with great success.

The GCP Stadium hosted all home matches of Anorthosis Famagusta's 2008–09 UEFA Champions League group stage campaign and all APOEL's 2009–10 UEFA Champions League group stage home matches. Two years later, it hosted all APOEL's home matches in the club's surprising run to the quarter-finals of the 2011–12 UEFA Champions League. Also, it hosted again all APOEL's home matches in their third participation in the 2014–15 UEFA Champions League group stages. All matches were sold out by APOEL's fans.

GCP Stadium also hosted AEK Larnaca's 2011–12 UEFA Europa League group stage matches, AEL Limassol's 2012–13 UEFA Europa League group stage matches, APOEL's and Apollon Limassol's 2013–14 UEFA Europa League group stage matches, Apollon's 2014–15 UEFA Europa League group stage matches and APOEL's 2015–16 group stage matches. GSP Stadium also hosted all APOEL's home matches in the club's impressive run to the last 16 of the 2016–17 UEFA Europa League.

Due to riots in Kiev and after UEFA's decision, GSP Stadium hosted the 2013–14 UEFA Europa League round of 32 match between Dynamo Kyiv and Valencia CF on 20 February 2014, which ended in 0–2 Valencia win.

In the 2016–17 domestic league season, tenants APOEL drew the highest average home attendance (7,126).

Concerts

Average attendances
The all-time attendance record for the football stadium is 23,043 tickets in the match between APOEL and Omonia for the 2002–03 Cypriot First Division. The match was held on 7 December 2002 and ended in a goalless draw.

The record of the highest attendance for a European Competition game is 22,701 tickets in the match between APOEL and Olympique Lyonnais for the 2011–12 UEFA Champions League last-16. The match was held on 7 March 2012 and ended with a 1–0 win for APOEL after extra time and 4–3 win on penalties.

Source: European Football Statistics

Attributes

GSP Athletic Centre includes
GSP Football Stadium
Weight Lifting Room 
Lockers (Fully Equipped) 
Doping Control Room 
Referees Lockers 
Delegate Room 
Indoor Warm Up Area 
Conference Rooms 
Secretarial facilities 
Restaurant 
Cafeteria 
Storage rooms 
Press room 
First Aid room (fully equipped) – Medical Center 
Physiotherapy room 
Press room 
VIP boxes 
Special seats for disabled people 
Air conditioning 
Central heating 
Fire alarm 
Telecommunication services 
Internet services – Wi-Fi Internet access
CCTV 
Matrix screen
Pitch size  = 105m x 68m
Lighting = 1400 lux 
VIP private boxes = 31 
Press seats = 200 seats 
Parking place = 2000 cars 
Annual events = 100–110 events

Outdoors and yet covered, the Stadium Square offers the best of both worlds, for large-scale activities of any kind. Located between the football stadium and the track and field stadium, this vast space provides maximum flexibility, as it can be furnished and equipped, decorated or divided as required for each event. Providing ample space for activities, catering and live DJ events – with or without paid entrance facilities – the Stadium square lends itself to:

 Full-scale parties, christenings or weddings
 Concerts 
 Exhibitions 
 Fun fair and bazaars

GSP Track and Field Stadium

Capacity = 5200 Seats 
IAAF Certificate = Class A 
Lighting = 800 lux

Includes :

Weightlifting room – Gym 
Indoor warmup area 
Photofinish installations 
Lockers (fully equipped) 
Doping control room 
Physiotherapy room 
Snack bars/canteens/restaurants 
Storage rooms 
First Aid room (fully equipped) 
Press Room
Telecommunication services 
Special seats for disabled people 
Air conditioning 
Central heating 
CCTV

Allegra GSP Sports Center

Hotel which includes:

34 double rooms (athletes) 
4 double rooms (trainers) 
2 single rooms (disabled people) 
2 double rooms (disabled people)
Reception
Conference rooms 
Meeting rooms 
Play room 
TV room
Restaurant
Cafeteria 
Training fields 
Gym 
Lockers
Massage rooms 
Therapy pools
Doping control room 
Medical center 
Air conditioning
Central heating 
Wi-Fi Internet access
Telephone – In every room
TV – In every room 
Parking

The Club
The Gymnastic Association Pancypria was founded in 1894 with the initiative of the lawyer Theofanis Theodotou and the doctors Antonios Theodotou and Aristofanis Fenievs.
Excellent athletes of GSP who won significant victories not only in Cyprus but abroad as well, brightened this stadium with their presence. GSP was linked with classic athletes of the capital and became the expresser (spirit) of the track and field.

In 1896, the G.S. Pancypria participated in the A' Pancyprian Games which took place in the G.S. Olympia Stadium in Limassol. Since then it has participated in all pancyprian games because the Pancyprian Games became a significant national feast for Cyprus, during which the stadium, where the games were taking place, was decorated with Greek flags and the national desires were proclaimed .

The athletes of GSP were declared winners of the Pancyprian Games and other games that took place in Cyprus, many times. Many of them were qualified periodically and sent abroad where they accomplished great victories.

References

External links

 Official website
 GSP Stadium on AllStadiums.ru (archived)
 Theo. David Architects

1999 establishments in Cyprus
Football venues in Cyprus
Athletics (track and field) venues in Cyprus
Multi-purpose stadiums in Cyprus
Cyprus
Sports venues in Cyprus
Sports venues completed in 1999
Sport in Nicosia
Music venues in Cyprus
Buildings and structures in Nicosia